Nihon Ishi Gakkai, Japanese Society for the History of Medicine, JSHM) is a juridical corporation (shadan hōjin) established in 1892 by the physician Fujikawa Yū and several colleagues in order to promote the study, research and communication of the history of medicine and allied sciences in all of its aspects. The secretariat of the society is housed in the Departement of Medical History, Juntendo University (Tokyo).

The Japanese Society for the History of Medicine publishes the Nihon Ishigaku Zasshi – Journal of the Japanese Society for the History of Medicine. It offers two scientific awards, the Fujikawa-Yū-Award (the former Scientific Promotion Award)  and the Yakazu-Award.

Literature 
Nihon Ishi Gakkai sōkai hyakkai kinenshi. Tokyo: Nihon Ishi Gakkai, 2000.

See also 
 Nihon Yakushi Gakkai
 Yōgakushi Gakkai

Annotations

External links 
Website of the JSHM (English/Japanese)
Website of the Kansai Chapter of the JSHM
Website of the Japanese Society for the History of Nursing (Japanese)
Website of the Japanese Society for the History of Psychiatry (Japanese)
Website of the History of Science Society of Japan (Japanese)

Scientific societies based in Japan
History of medicine
Organizations established in 1892